MusicMight (formerly RockDetector) was a rock music website which provides artist and product information through a global website and an ongoing book series. Based in New Zealand, the site was founded by British writer Garry Sharpe-Young, and was backed by a small team of international writers who contribute to the site.

Database contents
The database covered many styles and ages of rock music, such as thrash metal, black metal, death metal, radio rock and nu metal. As of December 2007, the database had over 59,400+ bands listed. The site included over 92,000 releases in the database and almost 659,000 songs. The site also had an international concert guide of over 300,000 concerts, archiving from 1965. The site also featured extensive and unique band biographies, many of which were the result of direct, first-hand interviews with band members conducted by Sharpe-Young during his many years as a heavy metal journalist.

Additional features included extensive discographies, pictures of the bands, their logos and their albums covers, upcoming concerts and album reviews.

The site went without updates for some time, bearing a message that a new expanded version of Rockdetector is on its way. On 1 September 2008 the site started after more than one year of re-programming and testing with an improved concept, layout and a re-designed database under the new name Musicmight.com with 60,000 artists and 144,000 persons included in the database.

Sharpe-Young died in March 2010. Site development, expansion and data additions have since halted, and the site was later taken down.

Growth

Books
Black Metal - September 2001
Death Metal - September 2001
Ozzy Osbourne - February 2002
Thrash Metal - October 2002
Power Metal - February 2003
Doom, Gothic & Stoner Metal - February 2003
80s Rock - July 2003
Black Sabbath - Never Say Die - 2004
New Wave of American Heavy Metal - November 2005
Sabbath Bloody Sabbath - The Battle For Black Sabbath - August 2006
Thrash Metal - Amended - October 2007
Death Metal - Amended - April 2008

References

External links
Official website

Heavy metal publications
New Zealand music websites